The Nanyang Technological University Libraries consist of eight libraries located within the Nanyang Technological University (NTU) campus in Jurong, Singapore. All of the libraries are open to all staff and students of NTU, regardless of which faculty they belong to. Members of the public can also use library facilities and view print resources, but only members of NTU may check out materials or access electronic resources.

The eight libraries consist of the main library, which is the Lee Wee Nam Library, and the Business Library, the Humanities and Social Sciences Library, the Chinese Library, the Communication and Information Library, the Art, Design & Media Library, Wang Gungwu Library, and the Medical Library (Novena campus). Each library has a specialised collection designed to cater to the needs of different segments of the faculty and students of the university. The libraries as a whole serve as learning centres for the entire NTU community, both to conduct personal research and engage in group discussions. The branch libraries were established with the aim of providing learning hubs for each school, as well as to house print and media collections which are of particular use and interest to the faculty and students there.

Lee Wee Nam Library (Science and Engineering collection)
This is NTU's flagship library building and was named in recognition for a generous donation by the family of the late Mr Lee Wee Nam. It houses the Engineering and Science collections and the library administration. This well photographed building has reading space to cater for both group discussion and learning as well as individual quiet reading. The window seats, in particular at Level 5, overlook the green campus surroundings and have an excellent view of Jurong West and even parts of the Straits of Johor.

Business Library 
This Library houses the core business collection of books and journals in the field of accounting, banking, business law, entrepreneurship, finance, hospitality management, international business, management, marketing and strategy. It also holds the main audio-visual collection comprising music CDs as well as VCD and DVD titles in all subject areas and genres. Ample workstations and media viewing rooms are provided for the listening and viewing pleasure of these audio-visuals. This Library is a popular place for many students as it has quiet spaces and individual study rooms as well as spaces for collaborative work distributed over four floors.

Humanities and Social Sciences Library
This interim library provides a growing collection relating to psychology, sociology, history, linguistics, literature, philosophy and public administration. To meet the diverse needs of users, the library has facilities for group learning and quiet study. Facing a gentle green slope, it also offers a conducive setting for reflection and leisure reading. It also provides printing services, conveniently located at the Reserves section.

Chinese Library
The Chinese Library houses resources in the Chinese language on Chinese literature, history, philosophy, religion, linguistics, politics, economy, sociology and management science. It is a small but welcoming area popular with users wishing to read Chinese language materials.

Communication and Information Library
The Communication and Information Library (CMIL) (formerly known as the Asian Communication Resource Centre) has a history spanning 20 years. It started operating in June 2003 through the merger of the Asian Media Information and Communication Centre (AMIC) Documentation Unit and the SCI Resource Centre. CMIL carries about 20 years of communication materials with a concentration of materials in development communication. It includes works pertaining to the fields of knowledge management, library science, information systems and journalism. There is also a large collection on development communication, as that was historically the main collection target of the library.

The collection comprises books and journals on advertising, broadcasting, information studies, journalism, knowledge management, library science, media law and ethics, amongst others. It also maintains materials pertaining to Communication in Asia with complete set of conference proceedings and research reports produced by the Asian Media Information and Communication Centre (AMIC) since 1971.

Art, Design & Media Library (ADM Library)
ADM Library is located within the School of Art, Design & Media and is specifically designed to reflect the creative and artistic nature of its environment. It houses a growing collection of resources in the visual arts, architecture, drawing, design, illustration, painting and photography and a strong collection of AV materials. Interesting areas in the library include a mini cinema, individual A/V viewing carrels, a flexible seating space and a large, writable black glass wall.

Wang Gung Wu Library
In 2003, Professor Wang Gungwu made a generous book donation to the Resource Centre at the Chinese Heritage Centre. The Resource Centre was renamed Wang Gungwu Library in recognition of the Professor's contribution to research on Chinese overseas and for his generous donation. WGWL focuses on collecting materials related to Chinese overseas.

Articles Published By NTU Librarians
Abdul Aziz, N. (2012). Discovering the Resource Mining Experience in your Library. Conference on GenNEXT Libraries 2012, (October 2011), 1–11. Retrieved from http://papers.ssrn.com/sol3/papers.cfm?abstract_id=2158340

Abdul Aziz, N., Bando, K., & Wan Yahya, W. A. H. (2013). Harvesting Scholarly Communication Padi Seeds via Mendeley Institutional Edition for your Academic Libraries. Persatuan Pustakawan Malaysia (PPM) Annual General Meeting for 2012/2013, 1–24. Retrieved from http://ssrn.com/abstract=2263120

Abdul Aziz, N., Chia, Y. B., & Loh, H. (2010). Sowing the seeds: towards reaping a harvest using social web applications in Nanyang Technological University Library. IFLA World Library and Information Congress (WLIC) 2010, (August), 1–25. Retrieved from http://dr.ntu.edu.sg/handle/10220/6450

Abdul Aziz, N., Harun, A. H., Tan, C., & Choy, A. (2008). Innovative library web marketing practices in Singapore: a landscape of hype, expectation and reality. Library Association of Singapore Conference 2008., (May), 1–19. Retrieved from https://dr.ntu.edu.sg/handle/10220/6070

Building a platform for knowledge engagement: Sowing seedlings in new media. 2012 6th IEEE International Conference on Digital Ecosystems and Technologies (DEST), (i), 1–6. https://doi.org/10.1109/DEST.2012.6227940

Anandasivam, K., Choy, F. C., & Fatt Cheong, C. (2008). The Electronic Library Designing a creative learning environment: NTU's new Art, Design and Media Library. New Library WorldTHE PLANNING AND DESIGN OF CHILDREN′S LIBRARIES Library Management. https://doi.org/10.1108/02640470810910675

Cheong, C. F. (2018). The Five Rules of Engagement for librarians: aux Ranganathan's laws of library science. In Library Management in Disruptive Times. https://doi.org/10.29085/9781783302369.004

Cheong, C. F., & Tuan, N. C. (2011). What Users Want and What Users Do in E-books: Findings of a study on use of e-books from NTU Library. Singapore Journal of Library & Information Management.

Cheong Choy, F. (2007). Libraries and librarians – what next? Library Management. https://doi.org/10.1108/01435120710727965

Cheong, F., Su, C., Goh, N., Choy, F. C., & Goh, S. N. (2016). Library Management A framework for planning academic library spaces A framework for planning academic library spaces. Library Management Library Management Iss Library Management. https://doi.org/10.1108/LM-01-2016-0001

Choy, F. C. (2011). From library stacks to library-in-a-pocket: Will users be around? Library Management. https://doi.org/10.1108/01435121111102584

Choy, F. C., & Goh, S. N. (2016). A framework for planning academic library spaces. Library Management. https://doi.org/10.1108/LM-01-2016-0001

Fatt Cheong, C. (2017). The Five Rules of Engagement for librarians. In Library Management in Disruptive Times.

Shaw, C., Mandel, C., Wilkinson, J., Kondo, H., Demirhan, A., Ovenden, R., ... Giordano, T. (2013). University libraries: 10 global portraits. The Guardian.

External links
 Official site
 Facebook page
 Twitter page

Libraries in Singapore
Nanyang Technological University